Damiani is an Italian surname. Notable people with the surname include:

Chip Damiani (1945–2014), American drummer
Damiano Damiani (1922–2013), Italian screenwriter and film director
Donatella Damiani, Italian actress
Ernesto Damiani, Italian scientist
Felice Damiani (active 1584-1606), Italian painter  
Francesco Damiani (born 1958), Italian former boxer, first World Boxing Organization heavyweight champion
José Damiani, president of the International Mind Sports Association, president of the World Bridge Federation for many years to 2010
José Luis Damiani (born 1956), Uruguayan retired tennis player
José Pedro Damiani (born 1921), Uruguayan politician
Juan Pedro Damiani, Uruguayan lawyer
Oscar Damiani (born 1950), Italian retired footballer
Paolo Damiani (born 1952), Italian jazz cellist and double-bassist
Peter Damian or Petrus Damiani (c. 1007-1072), Roman Catholic saint, cardinal and monk

Italian-language surnames
Patronymic surnames
Surnames from given names